Ice Pilots NWT (known in the UK and the US as Ice Pilots) is a reality television series broadcast on History Television that portrayed Buffalo Airways, an airline based in Yellowknife, Northwest Territories, Canada. Buffalo mainly flies WWII-era piston powered propeller planes as well as Lockheed L-188 Electra turboprop aircraft year-round in northern Canada. The show ran from November 18, 2009 to December 17, 2014, comprising six seasons.

History
Ice Pilots premiered on November 18, 2009. The show was renewed for a second season with filming completed on August 2, 2010. The season premiere was aired on History Television January 12, 2011. Season 3 was greenlit on August 18, 2010 and began airing on October 12, 2011. In the UK, series 2 was shown on Quest commencing May 2011. The episodes in season 4 have been shown on the Discovery Channel in the UK. Season 1 of Ice Pilots began airing on the National Geographic Channel in the US on April 22, 2011. Both Season 1 and 2 have aired in Australia on National Geographic Channel and National Geographic Channel HD, and currently air on the digital channel 7 Mate.

On February 2, 2012 The Weather Channel announced that it was adding Ice Pilots to its primetime lineup. On March 5, 2012 the show started airing on The Weather Channel, starting with seasons 1 and 2.

The National Geographic Channel no longer airs the show regularly, though it does occasionally broadcast episodes.

Ice Pilots NWT has been recognized with two Gemini Awards in 2011 for Best Original Music for a Lifestyle/Practical Information or Reality Program or Series and Best Photography in an Information Program or Series.

On July 27, 2012, Bruce Dickinson, lead singer of Iron Maiden, flew up from Edmonton to Yellowknife with Buffalo Airways. On July 28, Dickinson, who holds an airline transport pilot's license, flew a Douglas DC3 to Yellowknife and spent a day being filmed as a guest star for a season four episode.

On September 24, 2013, the Ice Pilots NWT Facebook page aired the first season 5 trailer, as well as the season 5 premiere date of October 23, 2013.

On January 15, 2014 the season 6 production was announced. Promos for season six stated that it would be the final season. It premiered on October 29, 2014. The final episode aired on December 17, 2014. The final episode covered a parachute jump over the D-Day remembrance period of June 2014.

Cast 
The cast/crew of Ice Pilots NWT consists of the following people:

Aircraft featured

Episode listing 

Seasons 1 through 5 each have 13 episodes. Season 6 only has 8. It was explained that season 6 has fewer episodes than other seasons because the filming decision for a season 6 was made later than the others, leading to less footage and materials being available.

Accolades
Ice Pilots NWT won several Leo Awards, Gemini Awards, and was nominated for the Canadian Screen Awards.

See also
 Arctic Air
 Alaska Wing Men
 Bombing Hitler's Dams 
 Deadliest Catch
 Flying Wild Alaska
 Gold Rush
 Ice Road Truckers 
 Ice Airport Alaska
 Skymed
 Yukon Gold

References

External links
Buffalo Airways website
Ice Pilots NWT  website

Aviation television series
Bush pilots
Documentary television series about aviation
History (Canadian TV network) original programming
Culture of Yellowknife
Television shows set in the Northwest Territories
Television shows filmed in the Northwest Territories
2000s Canadian reality television series
2010s Canadian reality television series
2009 Canadian television series debuts
2014 Canadian television series endings
Television series by Corus Entertainment
2000s Canadian documentary television series